Guo Tianmin (1905 – 26 May 1970) was a general in the People's Liberation Army of the People's Republic of China from Hubei. He was a descendant of the Tang dynasty general Guo Ziyi.

Early life 
Guo had his primary education in the provincial agricultural school, and later enrolled into the Wuchang Zhonghua University's Affiliated Middle School. He returned to his hometown in Guangzhou in 1925, joining several local rebellions. In the following year, he enrolled into the Whampoa Military Academy. He joined the Communist Party of China in March 1927 and participated in the Guangzhou Uprising in December. After the rebellion failed, he retreated to Haifeng, successively becoming the platoon leader and deputy commander in the 2nd and 4th Divisions of the workers and peasants revolutionary army.

In 1929, Guo traveled to Jiangxi to join the Red 4th Army and was appointed various positions such as division chief of staff and division commander. He was also made the chief of staff of the Jiangxi military region. However, he was expelled from his positions after supporting Mao Zedong and thereafter went to the Moscow Sun Yat-sen University to further his studies. He returned in October 1933 to resist the Nationalist forces during the Encirclement Campaigns.

In October 1934, he took part in the Long March. During the crossing of the Chishui River, he helped Luo Binghui command of the 9th Red Army Corps in operations. In July 1936, he was appointed as the commander in the Red Fourth Army and West Road Army headquarters. In 1937 February, he became the chief of staff of the Red Thirtieth Army, ordered to advance towards Dihua, Xinjiang.

Second Sino-Japanese War 
In December 1937, he went to Yan'an and was appointed the secretary of war in the CPC Central Military Commission. In 1938 August, Guo was the Shanxi-Chahar-Hebei military region's chief of staff. Subsequently in December he was made the 2nd army division commander tasked to carry out the guerrilla war. He participated in major campaigns such as the 1940 Battle of Niangziguan during the Hundred Regiment Offensive. His command post of the Hebei military region was shifted to Zhangjiakou after its occupation in August 1945.

References 

1905 births
1970 deaths
Chinese revolutionaries
People of the Chinese Civil War
Whampoa Military Academy alumni
People from Huanggang
People's Liberation Army generals from Hubei